Hordes of the Things may refer to:

 Hordes of the Things (radio series), a BBC radio parody of The Lord of the Rings
 Hordes of the Things (game), a miniature wargame